Darwin Prockop (born August 31, 1929) is an American biochemist and progenitor cell researcher. He has held academic posts at several universities, and has been a faculty member at the Texas A&M Health Science Center since 2008. Prockop has been elected to several academic societies, including the National Academy of Sciences and the Institute of Medicine.

Biography
Prockop completed an undergraduate degree from Haverford College and a master's degree in animal physiology from Brasenose College, Oxford. He earned a medical degree (1956) from University of Pennsylvania and a Ph.D. in biochemistry (1961) from George Washington University.

He has been a faculty member at the University of Pennsylvania, the University of Medicine and Dentistry of New Jersey (UMDNJ), Jefferson Medical College, and Tulane University. At Tulane, he directed the Center for Gene Therapy. Since 2008, he has worked at the Texas A&M Health Science Center, where he is Professor of Molecular and Cellular Medicine and the Stearman Chair in Genomic Medicine. He also serves as Director of the Institute for Regenerative Medicine at Scott & White Memorial Hospital in Temple.

Research
Prockop's research as a biochemist has focused on collagen and connective tissue diseases such as osteogenesis imperfecta and Marfan syndrome. In 2001, he organized the first scientific meeting focused on mesenchymal stem cells. Stem cell researcher Massimo Dominici said that "the cell therapy landscape would look completely different without his involvement."

Honors and awards
In 1991, Prockop was elected to the National Academy of Sciences. The following year he was elected to the Institute of Medicine. In 1994, he received a Distinguished Graduate Award from the Perelman School of Medicine.

References

Living people
1929 births
Haverford College alumni
Alumni of Brasenose College, Oxford
George Washington University alumni
Perelman School of Medicine at the University of Pennsylvania alumni
Texas A&M University faculty
Tulane University faculty
Jefferson Medical College faculty
Perelman School of Medicine at the University of Pennsylvania faculty
University of Medicine and Dentistry of New Jersey faculty
Members of the United States National Academy of Sciences
Members of the National Academy of Medicine